Junín is a town in Mendoza Province, Argentina. It is the head town of Junín Department.

The town was founded on January 18, 1859.

External links

 Municipal website

Populated places in Mendoza Province
Populated places established in 1859
1859 establishments in Argentina